Gisela Wurm (born July 31, 1957, in Wörgl) is an Austrian politician who has served as a member of the Austrian National Council from the Social Democratic Party of Austria from 1996 to 2017. In 2005, she was awarded the Decoration of Honour for Services to the Republic of Austria.

References

Living people
1957 births
Austrian politicians